The Seychelles Broadcasting Company (SBC) is the national broadcaster of the Republic of Seychelles with the mandate of informing, educating, and entertaining the population of Seychelles. Located on the hilltop of Hermitage, Mont Fleuri, the SBC owns and operates 3 Television channels namely SBC1, SBC2, and SBC3. Consistently, the Corporation also owns 2 of the largest radio station in the country, they are Paradise FM and Radyo Sesel.

The SBC also broadcast free-to-view international television services on its DTT platform. These channels include Al Jazeera, DW, TV5 Monde, TiVi5, TV5 Lifestyle, CGTN, CGTN French, RT and France 24. Additionally, the SBC also has the responsibility of relaying 2 international radio stations namely Radio France International (RFI) and British Broadcasting Corporation (BBC World Service) on FM.

Governance

The SBC is guided by Article 168 of the Constitution which makes provision for a State-funded but Independent broadcasting corporation.

 The State shall ensure that all broadcasting media which it owns or controls or which receive a contribution from the public fund are so constituted and managed that they may operate independently of the State and of the political or other influence of other bodies, persons or political parties.
 For the purposes of clause (1), the broadcasting media referred to in that clause shall, subject to this Constitution and any other law, afford opportunities and facilities for the presentation of divergent views.

The SBC Act 2011 establishes SBC as an independent body corporate administered by a board of directors, appointed by the President of the Republic. In 2017, amendments to the SBC Act (SBC Amendment Act 2017) changed the manner in which board members were appointed. The 2017 amendment also introduced the post of Deputy CEO.

External links  
 Official Site

Mass media in Seychelles
Publicly funded broadcasters